Chris "Douggs" McDougall (born 17 April 1976 in Australia) has a career spanning 25 years as a professional skydiver, BASE jumper and wingsuit pilot. He works globally as a keynote speaker (motivational, risk management) and is also founder of the largest BASE jump school "Learn to BASE jump".

BASE jumping 

Chris "Douggs" McDougall is a professional BASE jumper with more than 4,300 BASE jumps in 42 countries.

BASE jumping accomplishments

 2013 World record for most BASE jumpers jumping indoors
 2013 1st place in World Extreme BASE Championships, Spain
 2013 1st place in Accuracy Competitions in both Turkey and China
 2013 First ever BASE jumps in Kuwait from Al Hamra Tower
 2012 World first Night Human Slingshot, Dubai
 2011 2nd place in World BASE Championships
 2008 UK ProBase 'Who's The Daddy': Overall Champion
 2003/04 BASE jumping World Champion: 1st place Aerobatics, 1st place Team, 1st place Overall

Skydiving 

Chris "Douggs" McDougall has completed more than 7,200 skydives around the world. He is a 6 times national champion and former world record holder. 
He is advanced in all aspects of skydiving including free flying, relative work, canopy relative work, wingsuit flying, skydiving coaching & instructing, tandem skydiving and aerial camera flying.

Skydiving accomplishments

 1998-2003 6 time National Skydiving Champion in 4 way and 8 way RW
 2001-2003 Australian team member for World Championships
 2002 World Record 300 way Skydive
 12 Gold medals in various state events

References 

Living people
1976 births
Australian skydivers